Sophie Zhang may refer to:
 Sophie Zhang (whistleblower), data-analyst and Facebook whistleblower
 Zhang Xueying, Chinese actress whose English name is Sophie Zhang